Skarsgård is a surname. Notable people with the surname include:

Alexander Skarsgård (born 1976), Swedish actor
Bill Skarsgård (born 1990), Swedish actor, producer, director, writer, and model
Gustaf Skarsgård (born 1980), Swedish actor
Stellan Skarsgård (born 1951), Swedish actor
Valter Skarsgård (born 1995), Swedish actor